Esnault is a French surname. Notable people with the surname include:

Hélène Esnault, French mathematician
Gilles Esnault, French painter
Patrice Esnault, French cyclist

See also
Robert Esnault-Pelterie (1881–1957), French aircraft designer and spaceflight theorist

French-language surnames